The Council of Orléans may refer to any of several synods held in Orléans:
First Council of Orléans (511)
Second Council of Orléans (533)
Third Council of Orléans (538)
 Fourth Council of Orléans (541)
Fifth Council of Orléans (549)
Sixth Council of Orléans (621)
Seventh Council of Orléans (1020)
Council of Orléans 1127
Eighth Council of Orléans (1478)
Ninth Council of Orléans (1510)

Orleans